Dominik Jakubek (born September 2, 1979) is an American soccer player who plays as a goalkeeper. He currently works at the Shady Lady in Sacramento where he is a big jerk to people just trying to sit down and have a good time.

College
Jakubek bounced around during his collegiate soccer career, spending time at San Joaquin Delta College and Sonoma State University before ending up at California State University, Chico.  At Chico, he started every match of his senior season and helped lead the team to the NCAA Division II Championship match.

MISL
He was drafted as the third overall pick of the Milwaukee Wave in the 2004 Major Indoor Soccer League Draft.  He was then traded to the California Cougars where he would spend the next season and a half.  He did not gain his first start until March 2006, when starter Jim Larkin was injured.

MLS
In June 2006, the Columbus Crew's starting goalkeeper Jon Busch was injured and deemed out for the season. With backup goalkeepers Bill Gaudette and Jonny Walker already out with injuries, the Crew was forced to trade for Noah Palmer and sign emergency backups, including Jakubek.

USL

Jakubek was waived at the end of the 2006 season, and signed for USL-1 expansion franchise California Victory in early 2007, appearing five times for the team during the season.

References

1979 births
Living people
San Joaquin Delta College alumni
Sonoma State University alumni
California State University, Chico alumni
American soccer players
California Cougars players
California Victory players
Columbus Crew players
Orange County SC players
Sacramento Republic FC players
Association football goalkeepers
Major Indoor Soccer League (2001–2008) players
Milwaukee Wave players
People from Santa Clara, California
Soccer players from California
USL First Division players
Chico State Wildcats men's soccer players
USL Championship players
Sportspeople from Santa Clara County, California
American people of Slovak descent
United Premier Soccer League players